Zelus bilobus is a species of assassin bug found in Florida.

References 

Biological control agents of pest insects
Reduviidae
Endemic fauna of Florida